Cotti is an Italian surname. Notable people with the surname include:

Aleksandra Cotti (born 1988), Italian water polo player
Flavio Cotti (1939–2020), Swiss politician
Morgan Lyon Cotti, American political scientist

Italian-language surnames